Greendale is a village in Milwaukee County, Wisconsin, United States. The population was 14,854 at the 2020 census. Greendale is located southwest of Milwaukee, Wisconsin, and is a part of the Milwaukee metropolitan area. A planned community, it was established by the United States government during the Great Depression.

History

Native American Peoples
The first recorded inhabitants of the Greendale area were various Native American tribes, including the Potawatomi. The  1833 Treaty of Chicago struck an agreement between the United States government that required the Chippewa, Odawa, and Potawatomi tribes cede to the United States government their 5,000,000 acres, (2,000,000 ha). In exchange for ceding their lands in the area, they were to receive monetary payments and lands west of the Mississippi in Indian Territory.

1930s and beyond
Greendale was one of three government sponsored "Greenbelt" communities constructed by the Resettlement Administration, starting in 1936, as part of President Franklin Roosevelt's New Deal. The other Greenbelt communities were Greenbelt, Maryland and Greenhills, Ohio. The Village of Greendale was incorporated on November 1, 1938. The planners and selection committees excluded African American families from renting homes and created a racially segregated and all-white suburban community.

The original downtown area included the Village Hall, built in a Colonial Williamsburg style, 366 new homes comprising 572 living units, and several businesses. These homes were often referred to as "Greendale Originals." The Greenbelt communities were patterned after the British Garden city movement urban planning concept. The greenbelt communities were built to be walkable so residents could walk to schools, shops and parks. New Deal workers built Greendale as a model village for the working class. Income limits were from $1200 to $2700 per year, depending upon family size. In 1938, a one-bedroom Original rented for as little as $19 a month. Rent for a four-bedroom home was $46 a month. Over 200 of the "Originals" have unique artistic designs on the chimneys.

Federal ownership of Greendale ended in 1953. In the late 1950s Greendale experienced growth in conjunction with the expansion of the Milwaukee suburbs as a whole.  While new homes were built and the number of minority families increased in Milwaukee County, racially restrictive covenants were used to maintain the all-white Greendale community. In 1958, the Crestview Acres land was sold by Elroy H. Barbian for development with the restrictive covenant that only white families could purchase the homes. "No Persons other than the white race shall own or occupy any building on said tract, but this covenant shall not prevent occupancy of persons of a race other than the white race who are domestic servants of the owner or occupant of said building."

Southridge Mall opened in 1970 as the southern sister mall to Northridge Mall. Both malls were located on 76th Street, close to major east–west artery roads. Both were developed by Herb Kohl and Taubman Centers, Inc.

In 1996, the shopping district in the center of the village was purchased by the Grandhaven investment firm founded by Roy Reiman, founder of a publishing company headquartered in the village. The remake of the "Village Center" brought updates, attracted new restaurants, and made the village center more of a tourist attraction. More than 40,000 flowers are planted annually along the downtown streets, in hanging baskets, in sidewalk beds and storefront window boxes.

To ease managing more than 2,000 men during Greendale's construction, workers were directed to the "A section", the "D section", etc. This alphabetical reference has endured. Still today, all streets in each section begin with the same letter — the A section includes Angle Lane, Apricot Court, etc.,

Geography

Greendale is located at  (42.937615, −87.996884). The Root River flows through the western part of the village.

Greendale is bounded by the city of Greenfield to the north and east, the village of Hales Corners to the west, and the city of Franklin, Wisconsin to the south.[7]

Scout Lake is a 5-acre lake located in Greendale. It has a maximum depth of 19 feet. Fish include panfish, largemouth bass and northern pike.

Climate

Greendale weather by month

Greendale is in zone 5b of the USDA Plant Hardiness Zone Map.

Commerce 
Southridge Mall, is located in Greendale, and opened in 1970. It is Wisconsin's second largest mall behind Mayfair Mall in Wauwatosa, tied with Fox River Mall in Appleton. The mall's anchor stores are TJ Maxx, Dick's Sporting Goods, Golf Galaxy, Macy's, JCPenney, and Round 1 Entertainment.
The downtown village center has more than a dozen independent shops  and nine places to eat.

Community Organizations
Community members are active in many local civic organizations, church groups and school committees where they volunteer their time and talents for the betterment of the Village.
 Greendale Entertainment Association
 Greendale Historical Society
 Greendale Lions Club
 Public Celebrations Committee

Demographics

2010 census
As of the census of 2010, there were 14,046 people, 6,075 households, and 4,016 families residing in the village. The racial makeup of the village was 92.8% White, 1.2% African American, 0.4% Native American, 3.1% Asian, 0.9% from other races, and 1.6% from two or more races. Hispanic or Latino of any race were 4.7% of the population.

There were 6,075 households, of which 28.0% had children under the age of 18 living with them, 52.5% were married couples living together, 10.0% had a female householder with no husband present, 3.6% had a male householder with no wife present, and 33.9% were non-families. 30.1% of all households were made up of individuals, and 17% had someone living alone who was 65 years of age or older. The average household size was 2.31 and the average family size was 2.87.

The median age in the village was 45.3 years. 22.1% of residents were under the age of 18; 5.6% were between the ages of 18 and 24; 21.7% were from 25 to 44; 28.2% were from 45 to 64; and 22.2% were 65 years of age or older. The gender makeup of the village was 46.6% male and 53.4% female.

Education
The village has one public high school, one public middle school, and three public elementary schools (Canterbury, College Park, and Highland View). Greendale High School was named by Newsweek as one of America's Best High Schools in its 2009 & 2010 rankings. In 2007, the Greendale School District was ranked by Milwaukee Magazine as the top school system among the Milwaukee metropolitan area.

The Greendale High School Marching Band is an 18-time (17 consecutive) WSMA (Wisconsin School Music Association) state marching band champion, and a regular Bands of America Grand Nationals participant. The Greendale High School Marching Band is invited to appear in the 2022 Macy's Thanksgiving Day Parade.

Private Schools
 Greendale Baptist Academy.
 Greendale Playschool, 3K and 4K.
 Martin Luther High School is a private high school in the village.
 St. Alphonsus Catholic School, 3K through grade 8.

Events and Festivals
 Greendale Downtown Market, running on Saturdays from June through the first weekend in October. Sponsored by the Greendale Park and Recreation Department.
 Saturday Night Fun on the Green. Free music concerts every Saturday night from mid-June to mid-August in Gazebo Park. Sponsored by the Greendale Entertainment Association.
 Sunday Village Nites on the Green. Free music concerts every Sunday night from mid-June to mid-August in Gazebo Park. Sponsored by the Greendale Park and Recreation Department.
 Family Fourth Fest. Two music stages in Gazebo Park. Sponsored by the Greendale Lions Club.
 Greendale Garden Gazing Walk, a free walking tour through private gardens in Greendale, on one Saturday in July. 2022 was the 26th year.
 Every August, Greendale celebrates Village Days, an annual event since 1939. The three-day celebration commemorates the history of the village, attracting thousands to its parade, live music, dancing, and food and drink.

Government
There are two voting locations on Election Day:
Wards 1, 2, 3, 4, 9, & 10 - Greendale High School
Wards 5, 6, 7, 8, 11 - Highland View Grade School
Early voting takes place at the Village Hall.

County
Greendale is in Milwaukee County. It is in the 11th Milwaukee County Supervisor district.

State
Greendale is in the 28th State Senate District. Most of the village is in the 82nd State Assembly District, the remainder lies in the 84th State Assembly District.

Federal
Greendale is represented in the United States Senate by Senators Ron Johnson (R) and Tammy Baldwin (D). The village falls within Wisconsin's 1st congressional district, which is represented by Bryan Steil (R).

Historic places
 The Greendale Historic District was added to the National Register of Historic Places in 2005 and designated a National Historic Landmark in 2012.
 Trimborn Farm, is a Victorian era estate, and added to the National Register of Historic Places in 1980.
 Part of the Trimborn farm complex is the neighboring Jeremiah Curtin House, built in 1846, which is a unique stone house that was the boyhood home of noted American linguist and folklorist Jeremiah Curtin.

Performing Arts
 Greendale Community Theater,
 Greendale High School. Fall play and spring musical.
 Midwest Vocal Express (MVE), male a cappella chorus specializes in "Storytelling through Song," performing: traditional barbershop favorites, show tunes,  spirituals, popular music. Founded in 1989.

Points of Interest
 Greendale Public Library Member of the Milwaukee County Federated Library System. 6,533 residents have a Library card. 131,113 physical items were checked out in 2021. 24,276 eBooks, eMagazines, eAudio uses in 2021. The library has a collection of all 322 covers for The Saturday Evening Post that Norman Rockwell illustrated over the course of his career. 
 Greendale Veterans Memorial, honors those Veterans who have sacrificed so much in the defense of our country.  Dedication ceremony was held on Oct. 5, 2019.
 Historic Greendale Welcome Center, has displays of Greendale's history, showing the early creation of Greendale, Greendale's progression through the years, and Greendale today.
 Historic Hose Tower. A hose tower is a structure constructed for hanging firehoses to dry.

8 Churches
 Greendale Baptist Church
 Greendale Community Church
 Our Shepherd Lutheran church, home of The Word Today, an international radio evangelism network 
 St. Alphonsus Catholic Church and School. http://www.st-alphonsus.org/
 St. Luke's Lutheran church
 St. Stephen the Martyr Lutheran church
 St. Thomas of Canterbury Episcopal church
 The Way Church, non-denominational church located in Martin Luther High School.

Recreation 
Whitnall Park, the largest park in Milwaukee County. borders Greendale on the western boundary of the village. Whitnall Park offers many recreation options including:
 Whitnall Park Golf Course, an 18-hole golf course. Designed by George Hansen, and opened in 1932, this championship golf course is heavily wooded & offers views of Mallard Lake.
 Wehr Nature Center
 Boerner Botanical Gardens
 many hiking, biking and cross-country ski trails,

Part of the Root River Parkway is in Greendale. The Village is also connected to the Milwaukee County Park System Oak Leaf Trail, which provides opportunities for walking, running or biking.

The Rock Sports Complex, an athletic park in Franklin, Wisconsin, comprising baseball fields, mountain bike & BMX trails & snow play areas, borders Greendale on the southern boundary of the village.

Transportation

Greendale is 6 miles (9.6 km) from Milwaukee Mitchell International Airport and close to Interstate 94 and  Interstate 894. Running through the village is WIS 36. The Village is served by multiple transit lines with the Milwaukee County Transit System.

Notable people
 Jeremiah Curtin, (1840-1906) a 19th-century folklorist and linguist that lived in what is now Greendale. His boyhood home, Jeremiah Curtin House, a stone building built in 1846, is part of Trimborn Farm, and is a historic landmark.
 Alonzo Hauser, (1909-1988) American sculptor, creator of a bas relief on the Middle School, and the base of the flagpole, noted for New Deal sculpture
 Luke Eisner, star and actor in Tall Girl, was raised in Greendale and attended Greendale High School
 Jane Kaczmarek, actress; was born and raised in Greendale. Greendale High School graduate, class of 1974.
 Roy Reiman, founder of Reiman Publications
 Jim Gruenwald - Greco-Roman wrestler, former US Olympic team member.
 Mark Massa - State of Indiana Supreme Court justice,. Greendale High School graduate, class of 1979.
 Dave Smith - American Football League player. Greendale High School graduate, class of 1955.
 Stephen D. Burrows - Comedic storyteller, writer, director, actor  Greendale High School graduate, class of 1980.

Gallery

See also
 List of villages in Wisconsin

References

External links

 Village of Greendale
 Greendale Chamber of Commerce

 
Villages in Milwaukee County, Wisconsin
Villages in Wisconsin